Jacob Tratt (born 14 September 1994) is an Australian professional footballer who plays as a centre back for Western United.

Club career

Junior year
Tratt played his junior football with Western NSW Panthers. He also captained Sydney FC to the 2013–14 A-League National Youth League title.

Sydney FC
Tratt signed a one-year A-League deal with Sydney FC for the 2015–16 season.

Sydney United 58
He left Sydney FC at the end of the season, signing with Sydney United in the National Premier Leagues NSW.

Wellington Phoenix
Tratt returned to the A-League in September 2016, signing a one-year deal with Wellington Phoenix.

During his time at the Phoenix, Tratt made 20 appearances, starting every match of the season until he picked up an injury. He scored his first A-League goal against Melbourne Victory on 17 January 2017. Tratt left the club in April 2017, citing "personal and family reasons".

Return to Sydney FC
Tratt signed an injury replacement contract with Sydney FC in November 2018 after Ben Warland suffered a foot injury. He was a cult favourite at Sydney after he scored on debut against Western Sydney Wanderers, and scored the winning goal against Adelaide United.

Perth Glory
In July 2019, Tratt joined Perth Glory on a one-year deal. He scored a header in his debut match against Bayswater City, helping the team win the match 3–0.

Odisha FC
In September 2020, Tratt penned down a one-year deal with Indian Super League side Odisha FC. He appeared in 17 matches for Odisha as they finished at the bottom of the table.

Adelaide United
On the 6 August 2021, it was announced that Tratt was returning to the A-League after signing a one-year deal with Adelaide United.

Career statistics

Honours

Club 

Sydney FC
A-League Champions: 2018–19
National Youth League (Australia) Premiers: 2013–14

Sydney United
 National Premier Leagues NSW Premiers: 2016

References

External links

1994 births
Living people
Association football midfielders
Australian soccer players
Sydney FC players
Sydney United 58 FC players
Wellington Phoenix FC players
Perth Glory FC players
Odisha FC players
Adelaide United FC players
Western United FC players
A-League Men players
Indian Super League players
National Premier Leagues players
People from Dubbo
Australian expatriate soccer players
Australian expatriate sportspeople in India
Expatriate footballers in India
Sportsmen from New South Wales
Soccer players from New South Wales